Janet C. Hall (born September 15, 1948) is a Senior United States district judge of the United States District Court for the District of Connecticut. She sits in New Haven.

Education and career

Born in Lowell, Massachusetts, Hall received an Artium Baccalaureus degree from Mount Holyoke College in 1970. She went on to earn a Juris Doctor from New York University School of Law three years later. After obtaining her J.D., Hall entered private practice until 1975. Then, she landed a position as a trial attorney in the United States Department of Justice Antitrust Division, which she held until 1979. She was then a Special Assistant United States Attorney of the Eastern District of Virginia in 1979. From 1980 to 1997, she was in private practice in Hartford, Connecticut.

Federal judicial service

Hall was nominated by President Bill Clinton on June 5, 1997, to a seat vacated by T. F. Gilroy Daly. She was confirmed by the United States Senate on September 11, 1997, and received her commission on September 18, 1997. She served as Chief Judge of the United States District Court for the District of Connecticut from September 2013 to September 2018. She assumed senior status on January 21, 2021.

References

Sources

1948 births
Living people
Assistant United States Attorneys
Judges of the United States District Court for the District of Connecticut
Mount Holyoke College alumni
New York University School of Law alumni
People from Lowell, Massachusetts
United States district court judges appointed by Bill Clinton
20th-century American judges
21st-century American judges
20th-century American women judges
21st-century American women judges